Canada Creek may refer to the following places:

Canada Creek (Michigan), United States, a stream
Canada Creek Ranch, Michigan, United States, an unincorporated community near the stream
Canada Creek, Nova Scotia, Canada, a community